The Sidewinders (later the Sand Rubies) was a rock band from Tucson, Arizona, who released two major-label albums and scored two radio hits in the US before a lawsuit forced a change of name. Another album was released on a major label but by that time the band had nearly broken up. Since then the band has reunited and dissolved several times.

History
The Sidewinders formed in the spring of 1985 by guitarist Rich Hopkins and vocalist David Slutes. The group released its first record, Cuacha!, in 1988, and subsequently signed to RCA/Mammoth Records, where they released two full-length albums, 1989's Witchdoctor and 1990's Auntie Ramos' Pool Hall. Witchdoctor cracked the lower echelons of the Billboard 200 at No. 169, In 1990, Mammoth/RCA released a 7 track promo-only compact disc entitled "Do Not Play This Disc For Educational Purposes Only. It contained one track (Doesn't Anyone Believe) from the Auntie Ramos album, 3 unreleased acoustic  tracks (I'm Not With You, Signed D.C. and Singing Cowboy) and 3 alternate takes from Auntie Ramos album (If I Can't Have You, We Don't Do That Anymore and 7 & & Is) Three of the tracks on this disc are covers of songs by the band Love.  (on the strength of two modern rock radio hits; the band scored exposure on MTV and VH1 and embarked on a worldwide tour, but the band's career was soon sidelined due to legal problems. In 1991, a North Carolina band known as Sidewinders sued the group over the use of its name, and it took two years to sort out the proceedings and secure the release of their next album, now under the name Sand Rubies.

As the Sand Rubies, they released an album on Polydor/Atlas in 1993; at one point, Pearl Jam served as their opening act. However, due to attrition over the period of legal troubles, the rhythm section of the band had departed, and the Sand Rubies dissolved during a tour in 1993, just as two other Arizona rock bands, Gin Blossoms and The Refreshments, were attracting mainstream attention.

A few one-off shows were given in 1995 and 1996 before an official Sand Rubies reunion was announced in October 1996. A show at SXSW followed in 1997, as did a new album, Return of the Living Dead, in 1998. They were able to independently release a best-of collection of tracks from their major label years entitled The Sidewinders Sessions, and an all-covers album, Release the Hounds, ensued in 1999 along with a tour of Europe. The band broke up again, followed by short reunion stints in 2001-02 and 2006 to support renewed local touring and special rereleases. The band announced in 2011 that both the Sand Rubies and the Sidewinders would disband.

The band may have had a reunion appearance in mid-March 2013 in Austin, Texas, at SXSW (South By South West), at which Slutes, Hopkins, Andree were joined by Gene Ruley on guitar and George Duron (Dumptruck, Sally Crewe, Doug Gillard Electric) on drums.

Members
Rich Hopkins - Guitar
Jonathan Frank - Drums
David Slutes - Vocals
Bruce Halper - Drums
Mark Perrodin - Bass guitar
Andrea Curtis - Drums
Ken Andree - Bass guitar
Phil Jones

Discography
Sidewinders
Cuacha! (San Jacinto Records), 1987; re-released twice
Witchdoctor (Mammoth Records/RCA Records), 1989
7 & 7 Is EP (Mammoth/RCA), 1990
Do Not Play This Disc  For Educational Purposes Only (Mammoth/RCA) (Promo-only, 1990, 7 tracks)
Auntie Ramos' Pool Hall (Mammoth/RCA) 1990
The Sidewinders Sessions (Contingency Records), 1998

Sand Rubies
Goodbye EP (Polydor Records/Atlas Records), 1993
Sand Rubies (Polydor Records/Atlas Records), 1993
Sand Rubies Live (San Jacinto Records), 1996
Return of the Living Dead (San Jacinto Records)/(Contingency Records), 1998
Release the Hounds (San Jacinto Records)/(Contingency Records), 1999
Goodbye: Live at Alte Malzerei (San Jacinto Records)/(Blue Rose Records), 2002
Mas Cuacha (San Jacinto Records)/(Blue Rose Records), 2007

Charting singles

References

Musical groups established in 1985
Musical groups disestablished in 1999
Alternative rock groups from Arizona
Musical groups from Tucson, Arizona
1985 establishments in Arizona